Monte Emilius (3,559 m) is a mountain of the Graian Alps in Aosta Valley, north-western Italy. Located just above the town of Aosta, from where it is visible looking southwards behind the lower Becca di Nona, it is usually climbed starting from the ski resort of Pila, at a height of 1,870 m.

History 
This mountain was formerly known as Pic de dix heures, meaning "10 a.m. peak" in French, as the sun stands right on top of it at 10am, or even as Pic Chamosser or Pic Chamoisier. In 1839 the canon Georges Carrel climbed the peak with a 14-year-old girl named Émilie Argentier, the sister of the mountaineer and doctor Auguste Argentier (1830-1874) from Cogne, in order to promote mountaineering. The peak was thus named after her. Aostan canons thought about naming it Pic Pie in honour of Pope Pius IX, but decided against it as Pie in French means magpie.

Ascent 
A marked path from Pila usually takes one to the summit, past various lakes, with a bit of scrambling involved. The view from the top includes famous peaks such as Mont Blanc, Monte Rosa, the Matterhorn and Grand Combin

References

Mountains of the Alps
Alpine three-thousanders
Mountains of Aosta Valley